FC Time Lviv (Футзальний клуб "Тайм") was a futsal team from Lviv, Ukraine, which played in the Ukrainian Futsal Championship.

Squad 2009/2010

Palmares 
 Ukrainian Premier League: 2008-09, 2009-10
 Ukrainian  Cup: 2010
 Ukrainian  Supercup: 2009

External links 
 Official Site

Sport in Lviv
Futsal clubs in Ukraine
Football clubs in Lviv